Happiness Not Included is the fifth studio album by British synth-pop duo Soft Cell, released on 6 May 2022 through BMG Rights Management. It is their first studio album in 20 years, following Cruelty Without Beauty (2002). It was preceded by the release of the single "Bruises on All My Illusions" in 2021 as well as "Purple Zone" in 2022, the latter a collaboration with fellow British synth-pop duo Pet Shop Boys.

Critical reception

On review aggregator Metacritic, Happiness Not Included received a score of 78 out of 100 based on nine reviews, indicating "generally favorable" reception. Dave Simpson of The Guardian called it a "wryly hopeful record" with "some trademark electro bangers". Writing for The Line of Best Fit, Chris Todd summarised the "flavour" of the album as "one of world weariness peppered with salacious reflections of tales of past". Roisin O'Connor of The Independent remarked on the downbeat nature of the lyrics, writing that while Soft Cell "were hardly upbeat to begin with, [...] this is downright miserable" although acknowledging that they "have good reason to be" and concluding that "it's not all hopeless – at least the music is good".

Track listing

Charts

References

2022 albums
BMG Rights Management albums
Soft Cell albums